Vanë (also known as Cifliku Vana, Van, Vana, or Vanje) is a settlement in the Vlorë County of Albania. It is part of the municipality Delvinë. The village is inhabited by Aromanians.

References

Populated places in Delvinë
Villages in Vlorë County